Fessler-Secongost House is a historic home located at Boonville, Cooper County, Missouri. It was built about 1862, and is a -story, two-thirds-plan, vernacular Gothic Revival style brick dwelling.  It has steeply pitched cross-gable roof with bracketed eaves and a rear ell.

It was listed on the National Register of Historic Places in 1990.

References

Houses on the National Register of Historic Places in Missouri
Gothic Revival architecture in Missouri
Houses completed in 1862
Houses in Cooper County, Missouri
National Register of Historic Places in Cooper County, Missouri
1862 establishments in Missouri
Boonville, Missouri